John Tyler Cutting (September 7, 1844 – November 24, 1911) was an American Civil War veteran who served one term as a U.S. Representative from California from 1891 to 1893,

Biography
Born in Westport, New York, Cutting was left an orphan at ten years of age, when he journeyed westward.
Resided in Wisconsin and Illinois from 1855 to 1860.
He worked on a farm.
While employed as a clerk in a mercantile establishment attended the public schools of Illinois.
Enlisted in Taylor's Chicago Battery at the outbreak of the Civil War and served until July 20, 1862.
Reenlisted January 4, 1864, in the Chicago Mercantile Battery, in which he served until the close of the war.
He moved to California in 1877 and established a wholesale fruit and commission business.
He was a member of the National Guard of California, and subsequently assisted in the organization of the Coast Guard, of which he later became brigadier general in command of the Second Brigade.

Cutting was elected as a Republican to the Fifty-second Congress (March 4, 1891 – March 3, 1893).
He declined to be a candidate for renomination in 1892.
In 1894 settled in New York City, where he became interested in the automobile industry.
He retired to Westport, New York, in 1907.
He died in Toronto, Ontario, Canada, November 24, 1911.
He was interred in Hillside Cemetery, Westport, New York.

References

1844 births
1911 deaths
United States Army generals
Republican Party members of the United States House of Representatives from California
People from Westport, New York
19th-century American politicians